is a Japanese manga artist. He received the 1981 Shogakukan Manga Award for General for Chie the Brat.

References

Living people
1947 births
Manga artists from Osaka Prefecture
Tama Art University alumni